LIFG may refer to:

 Libyan Islamic Fighting Group, an armed Islamist group involved in the Libyan Civil War of 2014
 Left inferior frontal gyrus,  a gyrus of the frontal lobe